The University of King's College, established in 1789, is in Halifax, Nova Scotia, Canada. It is the oldest chartered university in Canada, and the oldest English-speaking university in the Commonwealth outside the United Kingdom. The university is regarded for its Foundation Year Program, a comprehensive and interdisciplinary examination of Western culture through great books, designed for first-year undergraduates. It is also known for its upper-year interdisciplinary programs – particularly its contemporary studies program, early modern studies program, and its history of science and technology program. In addition, the university has a journalism school that attracts students from across the world for its intensive Master of Journalism programs and its Master of Fine Arts in creative nonfiction, the first of its kind in Canada. Its undergraduate journalism programs are known for leading content in digital formats.

Although the university was first established as the King's Collegiate School in Windsor, Nova Scotia in 1788, a fire destroyed the original university in 1920, and the institution relocated to Halifax. The relocation was made possible with the help of Dalhousie University, which has since maintained a joint faculty of Arts and Social Sciences with King's. This partnership provides students at King's with full access to Dalhousie’s facilities and services. Despite this partnership, King's remains independent under its own charter.

The university is located on the northwest corner of the Dalhousie University campus.

History

Late 18th century and 19th century
King's College traces its origins to the King's College of New York City. On 31 October 1754, King George II of Great Britain issued the charter for King's College within New York City, establishing it as the oldest institution of higher learning in the state of New York and the fifth-oldest in the United States. In 1776, during the eruption of the American Revolutionary War, studies at the university halted for the subsequent eight years. During this period, the college's library was looted, and its sole building was requisitioned for use as a military hospital first by American and then British forces. When Patriots took over the university, Bishop Charles Inglis, the rector of Trinity Church, led the flight of Loyalists to Windsor, Nova Scotia. After the American Revolution, the old institution was resuscitated and eventually renamed Columbia College, which would develop into Columbia University.

In 1788, these resettled Anglican Loyalists founded the King's Collegiate School in Windsor. During the following year, the University of King's College emerged from the collegiate. In the same year, 1789, an act passed for "the permanent establishment and effectual support of a college at Windsor," and £400 per annum was granted towards its maintenance. The College opened in 1790, and received a Royal Charter from King George III in 1802, becoming Canada's first university. Even though the University of New Brunswick traces its history to King's College at Fredericton, which was established in 1785, it did not initially receive university powers and did not receive a Royal Charter until 1827.  Similarly, McGill University traces its origins to 1801 but did not receive a Royal Charter until 1821.

The university was generally modelled on older English universities which were residential, tutorial, and closely tied to the Church of England. With its strong Anglican affiliation, all students at King's College were required to adhere to the 39 Articles of the Anglican Church during the 19th century.

Upon discovering the chalice and paten of St. Peter's Anglican Church (West LaHave, Nova Scotia) were being sold in Halifax, Senator William Johnston Almon purchased them and donated them to the King's College Chapel (1891). The chalice is reported to be the oldest Anglican chalice in Canada, dated to c. 1663.

The Town of Windsor assert that students at King's College invented ice hockey c. 1800 on Long Pond adjacent to the campus.  (A similar game developed, perhaps independently, in Kingston, Ontario several years later which has led to occasional confusion about the sport's origins.)

The noted Canadian poet Sir Charles G. D. Roberts taught at King's College from 1885 to 1895.

Early and mid-20th century

On February 5, 1920, a fire consumed the university campus. Though the cause of the blaze is still unknown, tradition states it was caused by students "playing with matches" in a dormitory. Due to frozen fire hydrants, the blaze could not be put out and the buildings burned to the ground.

In 1922, the Carnegie Foundation offered a conditional grant to rebuild King's College. Among the provisions were that King's College was to be rebuilt in Halifax, the capital of Nova Scotia, and that it was to enter into an association with Dalhousie University. The partnership required King's to pay the salaries of select Dalhousie professors, who, in return, would help manage King's College. In addition, students at King's would be permitted to study at Dalhousie, while Dalhousie students would be permitted to study at King's with the exception of divinity; the granting of all other degrees outlined in the 1802 charter was to be temporarily halted. The conditions were in hope that one day all of Nova Scotia's universities would merge into a single body, much like the University of Toronto.

King's College accepted the funding, and relocated adjacent to Dalhousie's Studley Campus, at the corner of Oxford Street and Coburg Road. Alongside the move, the institution renamed itself "University of King's College'. Other universities in Halifax similarly did not follow through with the Carnegie Foundation's merger plan.

In the formative years of King's College, many more types of degrees were offered than the institution offers today; for example, the University of New Brunswick Faculty of Law traces its history to the "King's College Law School" that was established in 1892 in Saint John, New Brunswick by King's College (Windsor). While the University of King's College has never lost nor relinquished interest in these granting powers, they are held in abeyance due to agreements with the University of King's College's partner, Dalhousie University, as part of the agreement to allow the portion of Dalhousie's campus to be used by the University of King's College.

Consolidation was a way to strengthen this small and financially insecure institution. In the early part of this century, professional education expanded beyond the traditional fields of theology, law and medicine. Graduate training based on the German-inspired American model of specialized course work and the completion of a research thesis was introduced.

In 1923, the former site of King's College in Windsor was designated a National Historic Site.

When World War II broke out, King's was requisitioned by the military for the training of naval officers between 1941 and 1945. King's functioned as a "stone frigate", providing a facility for navigation training before officers were sent to their ships. This role is highlighted in the 1943 Hollywood feature film, Corvette K-225, a part of which was filmed on the University campus. The academic life of the College carried on during those years elsewhere in Halifax, aided by Dalhousie University and the United Church's Pine Hill Divinity Hall. In reflection of this naval past, the student bar on campus is known as the HMCS King's Wardroom, often referred to as "the Wardroom" or "the Wardy".

During the war, the Germans would occasionally broadcast names of Allied ships they had sunk. As ships had to keep radio silence, these reports could not be verified, and it was suspected that many were false. Allies circulated lists of non-active ships in the hopes of feeding the Germans misinformation; when the Germans broadcast that they had sunk HMCS King's, their ruse was exposed.

After the war, the campus was returned to the University. The policy of university education initiated in the 1960s responded to population pressure and the belief that higher education was a key to social justice and economic productivity for individuals and for society.

Late 20th century and 21st century

Until the spring of 1971, the university granted graduate theological degrees as well as undergraduate degrees. In the same year, the Faculty of Divinity was moved to Pine Hill, where it was formally amalgamated into the Atlantic School of Theology, an ecumenical venture with the United Church of Canada and the Roman Catholic Church. While this new institution now grants its own degrees, King's holds in abeyance its rights to grant divinity credentials and still continues to grant annual honorary degrees.

In 1972, King's faculty and alumni created the Foundation Year Program (FYP), a first-year great books course that would count for four of a student's five first-year credits. The program consisted of six sections from The Ancient World to The Contemporary World, in which students would read the work of major philosophers, poets, historians and scientists, receive lectures from a range of experts in all these areas, write critical papers and engage in small-group discussion and tutorials. The program initially had 30 students; it now draws almost 300 a year, most of whom live in residence on campus. Many of those who taught in the program in its early days were colleagues and students of the philosopher James Doull, who exercised a considerable degree of influence on the program in its formative stages. In 1989, Doull was awarded an honorary doctorate by the university.

In 1977, King's introduced two Bachelor of Journalism programs: a four-year honours degree and a one-year compressed degree for students who already hold a bachelor's degree.

In 1989, a campus library building was erected to commemorate the bicentennial of the university. It replaced a smaller library in the Arts and Administration building. The library has won numerous architectural awards. In 2000, the same architect designed the school's New Academic Building. In 2001, additional residence rooms were added in the basement of Alexandra Hall to accommodate some of the new students. Residence can currently accommodate 274 students, and nearly all on-campus living spaces are reserved for FYP students, though some spaces are reserved for upper-year students. All buildings on the present campus are celebrated reconstructions and derivations of the buildings of the original 1789 campus in Windsor, Nova Scotia. A system of tunnels connects the residences to the other buildings of the campus: a feature common to North American universities, and particularly common to many institutional buildings in Halifax.

The King's Library houses an impressive collection not only of rare Anglican church documents, but also a vast collection of original artwork, Renaissance and medieval books, and extensive archival material of relevance both to the history of Nova Scotia and the university. It also has some ancient artifacts, along with the Weldon Collection of fine imported china. Many of the rare books stem from the original, private collection of university founder, Charles Inglis. Recently, the blueprints for the buildings of the current campus were consulted in the library to restore the famed cupola crowning the A&A Building to its original, 1920s condition.

In 1993, King's created the Contemporary Studies program. In 1999, King's launched the Early Modern Studies program. In 2000, King's commenced the History of Science and Technology program. Each of these programs can constitute one component of a jointly conferred combined honours degree with Dalhousie. The Upper Year Program, like the Foundation Year Program, place a strong emphasis on historical contextualized, interdisciplinary study as opposed to traditional university departmentalization.

Today, there are over 1,000 students at King's, which represents significant growth over enrolment in the 1960s and 1970s. Its first-year class is made up mainly of Foundation Year Program students. In 2001, the FYP class was 274 students, with slightly over a hundred of these students coming from Ontario. The growing number of students from out of province reflects King's growing academic reputation and its transformation from a small, local college to a nationally acclaimed university. However, King's maintains strong ties to its host city and province and the number of Nova Scotians attending King's rose 23 per cent between 1994 and 2004.

The largest ever FYP class was in 2004, with 309 students. However, the administration has resolved to cap future classes at just under 300. With improved retention rates, the school's population looks to stabilize at around 1,200 in future years. The number of students leaving after first year has dropped significantly since the introduction of the upper year inter-disciplinary programs.

King's' transformation from a small college catering mainly to local Anglican students into a more intellectually cosmopolitan university with a strong national profile has been a resounding success. In terms of teaching quality, King's has been placed in the same academic league as top Canadian research universities like McGill and Toronto. One recent academic commentator summed up King's growing renown for its quality of teaching and eccentric student culture by remarking "If there is a Harvard of the North, it’s more likely King’s than McGill — although a better analogy would be a cross between Harry Potter’s Hogwarts and Camp Wanapitei in Temagami." The new programs, combined with a rigorous set of academic expectations and a cooperative academic culture, have proven a hit with high achieving high school students. Conservative estimates put the entrance average of first year King's students at 87%, or a strong A in Canadian high school marks.

In October 2003, Dr. William Barker was installed as president and vice-chancellor, replacing Dr. Colin Starnes. Dr. Barker and the rest of the university administration have declared that King's has grown as much as it can and should. They describe the coming years as "a time of consolidation", with a focus on retention and development of new programs.

The university's growth has changed some King's traditions. Formal meals, with Latin grace and academic gowns, formerly held at regular intervals, were suspended from 2001 until 2003. Only with the arrival of Dr. Barker were they reinstated. They now take place on the first Wednesday of every month.

In July 2006, the King's Student Union founded the King's Co-op Bookstore; it stocks every title on the FYP Reading List, as well as all necessary books for King's other courses and a number of Dalhousie courses and general interest fiction and non-fiction. The bookstore is a student-owned co-operative which functions separately from both the student union and the university.

King's College administration has not avoided controversy. After the Sodexo cleaning staff unionized in 2004, the housekeeping contract was awarded to a different company during the summer. The King's Student Union had been involved in encouraging the workers to unionize in order to improve their working conditions, and there were strenuous objections to the awarding of the new contract.

The University of King’s College's arms were registered with the Canadian Heraldic Authority on August 15, 2007.

Academics

King's best known program is its Foundation Year Program (FYP) for first year students, an intensive survey course of history, philosophy, and literature in the western tradition. The Contemporary Studies Program (CSP), the Early Modern Studies Program (EMSP), and the History of Science and Technology Program (HOST) are offered jointly with Dalhousie University as combined honours degrees requiring a second honours discipline. If the students decide to do a King's subject as their primary honours subject, they are required to write an honours thesis, varying in length from program to program. A Bachelor of Journalism program is offered as either a four-year honours degree or an intensive one-year program to students already holding a bachelor's degree. King's College and Dalhousie University also jointly offer a 10-month Master of Journalism program and a two-year limited residency Master of Fine Arts degree in Creative Nonfiction program.

King's students generally take FYP in their first year and choose a specific degree program to pursue in their final three years. Most students at King's take at least some classes through programs at Dalhousie University. With the exception of the journalism program, King's students graduate with joint degrees from King's and Dalhousie. King's students are eligible to complete these degrees in any subject from Dalhousie's Faculty of Arts and Social Sciences or Faculty of Science.

Foundation Year Program
The Foundation Year Program is a core-text program for first-year students; it surveys the history of western thought and culture from ancient times to the present day. It has been offered since 1972. The course has traditionally been divided into six sections.

The Foundation Year Program (FYP) has been described by the Association of Universities and Colleges of Canada as having "a national reputation for excellence as an alternative first-year of undergraduate studies", and is regarded as a prototype for similar programs elsewhere; the principal Canadian news magazine Maclean's expresses the view in a discussion of small, specialized undergraduate programs in Canada that "it's unlikely that any of the other programs would exist if not for the Foundation Year at King's". In both 2008 and 2009, the FYP program had been ranked first in Canada by the National Survey of Student Engagement.

Student life

Traditions
Once every two months, formal meals are held. Students wearing traditional academic gowns are led into the meal hall by a bagpiper. Once they have found their seat, a Latin grace is said. Afterwards, the catered meal begins. These meals were formerly held at regular intervals, but were suspended from 2001 until 2003. They were reinstated during the presidency of William Barker at his behest.

The UKing's Literary Society (formerly the Haliburton Society), a student-run literary society, has hosted discussions concerning poetry and prose since 1884. The society remains the longest-standing university literary society throughout the Commonwealth of Nations and North America. The society took its original name from the Canadian politician Thomas Chandler Haliburton. It adopted its current name in 2020, as a result of a long-standing controversy over Haliburton's pro-slavery views.

Residence
The residences are built in the Georgian style typical of the original campus. Each "bay", as the original residences were termed in Windsor, is modelled on the system of 'staircases' at England's Oxford University. Each has also been named with a seemingly ironic moniker: North Pole Bay sits atop the university's boiler rooms, and is arguably the warmest location on campus; Chapel Bay is named after the campus chapel, but is located the furthest distance from it; Radical Bay originally housed the refined, quiet divinity students; Middle Bay, which was named for its location as it is between Chapel and Radical, is named ironically as being the only non-ironic name; in addition, there is Cochran Bay, named after the first president of the College, William Cochran, and is the closest to the campus chapel.

Often residence-wide parties, known as 'bay parties,' occurred, but were cancelled for in 2003. However, there was a brief a revival during the 2005-2006 school year, with both Radical Bay and Cochran Bay hosting several highly successful events. In place of this tradition, each Bay now organizes a themed-event on campus during different times of the school year.

Another consequence of increased enrolment has been a more unbalanced composition of the residences. Traditionally, students from all years of study have lived in residence, but increasingly, very few upper year students continue to live on campus, thus making way for more first years. In 2006, Alexandra Hall, traditionally the all-women's residence, was made co-ed for the first time with rooms in the basement alternating between male and female occupants as well as one wing of the first floor becoming all-male. In addition, two of the five bays were re-converted to co-ed living spaces in 2006.

Annual events

Alex Fountain Memorial Lecture
Since 2011, an annual memorial lecture is given by an individual chosen each year by the student body. After a nomination process at the beginning of the winter semester, a long list of twenty is narrowed to a short list of ten by student election. The short list is then prioritized by a student committee, which includes the program directors and president. The lecture is free, open to the public, and concludes in a question and answer period. Previous lecturers and lectures include Michaëlle Jean on 'Building Social Change Locally and Globally', Charles Taylor on 'Is Democracy in Danger?', Michael Ondaatje on 'Mongrel art: A discussion of literature and its neighbours', Jan Zwicky on 'What Meaning Is and Why It Matters', and Tanya Tagaq on 'Climate, culture, and collaboration', as well as Canadian author Joseph Boyden.

The event is held in memorial after Alex Fountain, a student who died by suicide on 22 August 2009 at the age of 20. His family donated $1 million to the mental health program at the Queen Elizabeth II Health Sciences Centre, as well as additional contributions to other mental health programs at Dalhousie University, the IWK Health Centre and Capital Health. In addition, they founded the lecture series.

Athletics
King's is a member of the Atlantic Colleges Athletic Association (ACAA). The Varsity athletics teams at the University of King's College are named the Blue Devils. Sporting teams include men's and women's basketball, soccer, badminton and rugby, and women's volleyball.

People

List of presidents
 William Cochran (1789–1804)
 Thomas Cox (1804–1805)
 Charles Porter (1805–1836)
 George McCawley (1836–1875)
 John Dart (1875–1885)
 Isaac Brock (1885–1889)
 Charles E. Willets (1889–1904)
 Ian Hannah (1904–1906)
 C. J. Boulden (1906–1909)
 T. W. Powell (1909–1914)
 Charles E. Willets (Acting President, 1914–1916)
 T. S. Boyle (1916–1924)
 A. H. Moore (1924–1937)
 A. Stanley Walker (1937–1953)
 H. L. Puxley (1954–1963)
 H. D. Smith (1963–1969)
 F. Hilton Page (Acting President, 1969–1970)
 J. Graham Morgan (1970–1977)
 John Godfrey (1977–1987)
 Marion G. Fry (1987–1993)
 Colin Starnes (1993–2003)
 William Barker (2003–2011)
 Anne Leavitt (2011–2012)
 George Cooper (2012–2016)
 William Lahey (2016–present)

Notable current and former faculty
 Michael Bishop - Author of The Endless Theory of Days and Scholar of French Contemporary. Director of Editions VVV Editions
 George Bain - Director of the School of Journalism, 1979–85
 Wayne Hankey - Carnegie Professor and Chair of the Classics department at Dalhousie, 2001-2015
 Robert D. Crouse - Chair of Classics department at Dalhousie, co-founder of Dionysius
 Sir Charles G. D. Roberts - prominent member of the group known as the Confederation Poets
 Henry How - Chemist and mineralogist, described two minerals new to science: howlite and mordenite
 Dean Jobb - Associate Professor of Journalism, former reporter and editor for The Chronicle Herald
 Kim Kierans - Vice president (2010–2017), former director of the King's School of Journalism, and writer/editor for CBC Radio One
 Stephen Kimber - Rogers Communications Chair in Journalism, prominent journalist and columnist for The Daily News
 Daniel Brandes - Director of the Foundation Year Program, and author of Nietzsche, Arendt, and the Promise of the Future and Fackenheim on Self-Making, Divine and Human
 Gordon McOuat - former Director of the History of Science and Technology Program
 Susan Newhook - Assistant Professor of Journalism and researcher, reporter and editor for CBC from 1980 to 1998
 Samuel Henry Prince - Founder of the Dalhousie School of Social Work, and author of Catastrophe and Social Change.
 Stephen Snobelen - Director of the History of Science and Technology Program; Featured in BBC documentary Newton: The Dark Heretic
 Walter Stewart - Director of the School of Journalism
 Kelly Toughill - Director of the King's School of Journalism and former Deputy Executive Editor of the Toronto Star
 Fred Vallance-Jones - Associate Professor of Journalism and former Investigative reporter at The Hamilton Spectator and CBC Radio
 Laura Penny - Author of Your Call Is Important To Us: The Truth About Bullshit and More Money Than Brains: Why School Sucks, College is Crap, and Idiots Think They're Right

Notable alumni
 Matt Aronson - Politician, lawyer and activist.
 Rich Aucoin - Canadian indie rock musician.
 Kathryn Borel - writer, editor, radio producer.
 Margaret Sibella Brown - Bryologist
 Ryan Hemsworth - Producer and DJ
 William Johnston Almon
 Charles Austin, Matthew Murphy and Drew Yamada of The Super Friendz - Influential Canadian rock band of the 90s
 James "Calbert" Best - Journalist and Canadian Diplomat.
 Frederick Borden - Canadian Minister of Militia and Defence from 1896–1911
 Jordan Breen - Senior Editor at Sherdog.com, curator of Sherdog FightFinder, featured Mixed Martial Arts Columnist.
Ben Caplan - folk musician 
 Amor de Cosmos (1825–1897) - Premier of British Columbia, 1872-1874
 Darrell Dexter - Nova Scotia Premier, 2009–2013
 Starr Dobson - CTV Atlantic Live At 5 Reporter, 1990-2013
 Jay Ferguson and Patrick Pentland of Sloan
 Lionel Avard Forsyth - President of the Dominion Steel and Coal Corporation
 Simon Gibbons - Canada's first Inuit priest
 Trevor Greene - Writer, journalist, Canadian veteran wounded in the War in Afghanistan and subject of the documentary Peace Warrior
 Darren Greer - Winner of the 2015 Thomas Head Raddall Award for his novel Just Beneath My Skin 
 Thomas Chandler Haliburton - Author
 John Hamm - Nova Scotia Premier, 1999–2006
 Emily Horne - Co-creator and photographer for the weekly comic strip A Softer World
 Sir John Eardley Inglis (1814–1862), in charge of the British forces at the Siege of Lucknow
 Martine L. Jacquot - Author, journalist and academic
 Amber MacArthur - Internet media personality
 Julianne MacLean - novel writer
 Russell MacLellan - Nova Scotia Premier, 1997–1999
 Steve Maich - Editor of Canadian Business magazine
 Stephen Marche - Author of Raymond & Hannah
 David McGuffin - CBC Africa correspondent
 H. R. Milner - lawyer and businessman; Chancellor from 1957 to 1963
 Stephanie Nolen - Africa correspondent for The Globe and Mail and author of 28: Stories of AIDS in Africa
 Roland Ritchie - Justice of the Supreme Court of Canada
 Cuthbert Aikman Simpson - Dean of Christ Church and Regius Professor of Hebrew at Oxford University
 Johanna Skibsrud - Author of The Sentimentalists, 2010 Scotiabank Giller Prize winner
 Thomas Suther - Bishop of Aberdeen
 Miriam Toews - winner, 2004 Governor General's Award for Fiction for her novel A Complicated Kindness.
 Al Tuck - folksinger 
 Ian Walker - Sports columnist with The Vancouver Sun turned television and film screenwriter
 Augustus Welsford - One of two soldiers whose heroic deaths at the Siege of Sevastopol during the Crimean War are marked by the Welsford-Parker Monument in Halifax's Old Burying Ground
 Stuart J. Woods - Editor of Quill & Quire magazine
 Millefiore Clarkes - PEI filmmaker

See also

 List of Anglo-Catholic churches
 Royal eponyms in Canada
 List of oldest universities in continuous operation
 Higher education in Nova Scotia
 List of universities in Nova Scotia
 Canadian university scientific research organizations
List of National Historic Sites in Nova Scotia

References

Further reading
 Roper, Henry. "Aspects of the History of a Loyalist College: King's College, Windsor, and Nova Scotian Higher Education in the Nineteenth Century". Anglican and Episcopal History 61 (1991).
 Vroom, Fenwick Williams. King's College: A Chronicle, 1789-1939.
 DeWolf, Mark. All the King's Men: The Story of a Colonial University  (1972)
 Kinghorn, Alexander Manson. University of King’s College Halifax, Nova Scotia : The Overseas Commonwealth’s Oldest University (1965)

External links 

 
 King's Student Union
 King's College National Historic Site of Canada

1789 establishments in Nova Scotia
History of Halifax, Nova Scotia
 
Kings
Kings
Educational institutions established in 1789